Vernett "Vernie" Bennett (born 17 May 1971) is an English singer and lawyer. She is a founding member of R&B girl group Eternal, with her sister Easther Bennett also a member. The original line up included Kéllé Bryan and Louise Redknapp.

The band was formed in 1991 and released their first single 'Stay' in 1993 which achieved their first top ten hit in the UK and their first top 20 hit on the American Billboard Hot 100 Chart. 

Nominated for four Brit Awards, the band went on to sing the soundtrack for the Disney film The Hunchback of Notre Dame and achieve several top ten hits. They sang for the Pope in the Vatican, took part in the anti-apartheid movement by performing in Johannesburg's biggest ever outdoor concert with Midnight Oil, Sting and other well-known artists in South Africa and featured on a Pepsi campaign. The band sold over 10 million records and achieved their first number one in 1997. 

A total number of five albums were released throughout the band's career; Always and Forever, Power of a Woman, Before the Rain, Greatest Hits, and Eternal. The latter self entitled album only included Vernie and her sister, Easther, and included their first release "What'cha Gonna Do" before the group disbanded altogether.

Soon after this, Vernie Bennett returned to her studies and completed her law degree. She went on to complete her Bar finals and has since settled down to family life with husband Bryan. Vernie was voted one of the top 50 sexiest women in FHM, and in 1998 featured on the front cover of Pride Magazine. She presented Songs of Praise, 'Gala Bingo' and at MTV Awards.

In 2013, Vernie re-joined her bandmates Easther and Kelle for a brief reunion on a show called the 'Big Reunion'. This led to the group performing a number of select gigs like 'Cardiff Gay Pride' 2014 before disbanding one last time.

In 2014, Vernie talked to The Express newspaper about her anguish over losing her brother to lung cancer. That same year, she walked half a marathon for charity on the 'Shine Walk' raising money in his honour. In 2015, Bennett appeared with her husband Bryan on ITVs All Stars Mr & Mrs and raised a further £30,000 for charity, which she donated to Cancer Research and CMV Action UK.

She took her debut acting role on stage in Jack and the Beanstalk as the 'Spirit of the Beans', and continues to be a supporter of the charity known as CMV Action UK.

Eternal
Eternal were formed in 1992 and originally consisted of the Bennett sisters, Kéllé Bryan, and Louise Redknapp. They became a trio in 1995 when Redknapp quit the group to go solo. Eternal eventually disbanded in 2000 after selling 10 million records worldwide.

In December 2013, it was announced that Eternal would be reforming for the second series of the ITV2 reality-documentary The Big Reunion. Redknapp chose not to take part, but wished her bandmates all the best.

Personal life
After the split, Vernie stepped out of the limelight and went back to university to finish studying law and has since become a practising lawyer. In 2006, she gave birth to her first child. In August 2010, she signed with ASM Artist Management. She currently lives in London with her husband and their two children.

References

Living people
1971 births
Eternal (band) members
20th-century Black British women singers
British contemporary R&B singers
English people of Jamaican descent
21st-century Black British women singers